Matteo Lanzoni (born 18 July 1988) is an Italian professional footballer who plays for Collina d'Oro as a defender.

Lanzoni was born in Como and began his career at local club Calcio Como, before joining Sampdoria as a trainee in 2005; signing his first professional contract three years later. Lanzoni failed to make a first-team appearance for Sampdoria but spent several loan spells with Bari, Sambenedettese, Mantova, Portogruaro, Foggia and Carrarese before being released in 2013. After his release Lanzoni signed a short-term deal for English Football League One side Oldham Athletic.

Career

Sampdoria
Lanzoni spent most of his early career at Serie A side Sampdoria. After several loans to various clubs throughout Italy he was released by Sampdoria after five years at the club.

Oldham Athletic
Lanzoni went on trial at English League One club Oldham Athletic in 2013. After impressing manager Lee Johnson he was offered a four-month contract with the club, which he signed on 29 August 2013 to officially become an Oldham Athletic player.

Lanzoni made his debut for the Latics within a couple of days after signing his contract, starting against Tranmere at right-back following an injury to right-back Connor Brown. Lanzoni played the whole 90 minutes and received the Man of the Match award.

On 14 September 2013, against Rotherham United, Lanzoni scored his first goal for the club, scoring Oldham's second goal of the game from close range.

On 31 December 2013, it was announced that he had left Oldham after turning down a new contract from the club. He had made 15 appearances for the club, scoring twice.

Yeovil Town
On 2 January 2014, Lanzoni signed for Yeovil Town on an 18-month contract.

Cambridge United
On 28 August 2014, Lanzoni left Yeovil by mutual consent and signed for Cambridge United. At the end of the 2014–15 season the club did not offer him a new deal when his contract expired.

References

External links
 
 

1988 births
Living people
Sportspeople from Como
Association football defenders
Italian footballers
Italy youth international footballers
Italian expatriate footballers
Como 1907 players
U.C. Sampdoria players
A.S. Sambenedettese players
Mantova 1911 players
Calcio Foggia 1920 players
Carrarese Calcio players
Oldham Athletic A.F.C. players
Yeovil Town F.C. players
Cambridge United F.C. players
Serie C players
English Football League players
Expatriate footballers in England
Footballers from Lombardy